Margaret Black is the name of:

 Margaret Moyes Black (1855–1920), Scottish novelist
 Maggie Black (1930–2015), American ballet teacher

See also
 Jill Black (Jill Margaret Black, born 1954), British jurist